Crossroads is a 1942 mystery film noir directed by Jack Conway, starring William Powell, Hedy Lamarr, Claire Trevor and Basil Rathbone. Powell plays a diplomat whose amnesia about his past subjects him to back-to-back blackmail schemes, which threaten his reputation, job, marriage, and future. The film was inspired by the 1938 French film Crossroads which had also had a British remake Dead Man's Shoes in 1940.

Plot
In 1935, rising French diplomat David Talbot (William Powell) and his beautiful much younger bride Lucienne (Hedy Lamarr) are celebrating their third month of marriage. They are  interrupted by a note from the mysterious Carlos Le Duc (Vladimir Sokoloff) demanding $1 million francs from David.  Failure to make good will force Le Duc to reveal Talbot's identity to the police as a welsher.

Pretending to cooperate, Talbot appears at the ransom drop, leaves a package of wrapped paper in lieu of the banknotes, and Le Duc is apprehended by hidden gendarmes. During the trial which follows, Le Duc’s defense is that he was seeking repayment of a legitimate debt owed by a former business associate, incurred in 1922. Talbot is accused of being that man, career thief Jean Pelletier. 

The prosecution denies that Talbot is Pelletier, and charges that Le Duc is guilty of extortion. Talbot maintains that he suffered from amnesia following the devastating train accident that same year, prevents him from remembering anything from that time.  Talbot's identity is affirmed by the psychologist who treated him following the wreck, Dr. Tessier (Felix Bressart), ever since becoming a family friend. Talbot's strategy is foiled by a psychologist for the defense, Dr. Alex Dubroc (Sig Ruman), who tricks Tessier into conceding the unreliability of a diagnosis of amnesia.  He suggests that Talbot fabricated the story after riding on the train, in hopes to hide his true identity. At present, no one really knows, because after these two similar looking men boarded the train, only one survived. Was it Pelletier or Talbot?

A glamorous night club chanteuse is introduced on behalf of the defense, Michelle Allaine (Claire Trevor). She maintains she has never seen Talbot before, until, at mere arm's length, their gazes lock, and she spontaneously gasps a longing “Jean”...! The implication to everyone is that they were former lovers.

A surprise witness then appears, who volunteers to testify on Talbot‘s behalf, Henri Sarrou (Basil Rathbone). Claiming to know Talbot before his injuries he convinces the court David's identity is genuine, in spite of the previous romantic imprecation. Le Duc is convicted.

Shortly after, Sarrou cavalierly appears unannounced at the Talbot home in mid-soiree, where he privately demands the same million francs as Le Duc had done. Sarrou claims that Pelletier, himself, and Le Duc were cohorts in a two million franc robbery. Sarrou tells Talbot that he is Pelletier, and that he took all the cash, after shooting and killing the man carrying the money on his way to the bank. Sarrou demands half of the loot, one million francs. Talbot orders him out of his home for being a scoundrel. 

Not long after, Michelle Allaine makes a second surprise appearance at the Talbot home in their study, shorter after pretending to apologize to him for her implicating sigh at the trial at his office, but she is really there to coyly reveal for just a fleeting moment a locket holding a cameo of the pair in smiling embrace.  She's also there to lure him, just after the visit with his wife, hoping to raise more suspicion of prior intimacy and future infidelity.  Shaken by what has just transpired, Talbot begins to become ever more convinced that he's Pelletier, and becomes further determined to keep his writhings from Lucienne.

Anxious to see Allaine again and draw her out further, Talbot later slips off and visits her at the nightclub where she works.  She haughtily upbraids him for masquerading as an eminent diplomat, rumored shortly to be France's next ambassador to Brazil, living lavishly while abandoning his aged peasant mother to penury.  She dares him to go see for himself, then gives him the address. He goes there to meet her. He asks her if he could be her son, which upsets her. She tells him she's an old woman and asks him to leave, pleading that she needs her rest. He is riven to his core, by the sad old woman who recognizes him, but refuses his charity. He returns home, offering Lucienne an alibi to his whereabouts.

Worried about David, Lucienne visits Dr. Tessier the following day, explaining that if David was really Pelletier, 
she would still love him. She suspects that Sarrou is a blackmailer, and considers handing over her own jewels and money to make he go away.

The following day, Sarrou shows up at David's club, demanding his receives his money that very evening, or he will contact the police. Later, David asks Lucienne to attend a party that evening at Deval's alone, claiming he needs to help a colleague. After she departs, Sarrou phones David, telling him he knows about a Saigon ticket he bought in a feeble attempt to escape, and threatens him again.

He races back to the club to find Sarrou and Allaine together.  Sarrou gives him a deadline to pay the million francs.  Talbot returns home, sneaks his passport out of a wall safe while just dodging his wife, then makes reservations the next day to flee alone to the Far East.  Before he can Sarrou chastises him, recounting his every furtive move.  He is cornered and must pay.

Where to get the money?  He wouldn't have enough even if he sold his house.

Why raid his office safe, where he keeps a cache of millions of the nation's francs to make unrecorded payments in sensitive diplomatic matters.  He speaks the daring idea aloud as it dawns on him.  Sarrou jumps at the opportunity to accompany him and immediately seize his ransom.

The pair sneak past the guards at the foreign ministry.  Talbot turns over the cash.  Seeking to thwart her husband's self-destruction Lucienne appears, too late to prevent the crime.  Just then flashlights appear - it's the police!  Everyone's caught red-handed.  Disaster!

No, they're there to arrest Sarrou.  Talbot had alerted them ahead of time - just as he had with Le Duc - having realized when looking incidentally at his passport photo that his hair had been parted on the same side in the cameo in Allaine's locket.  Impossible, as a scar from the rail accident had forced him to switch.  The photo with his "lover" taken before the wreck had to have been a forgery, impelling his surreptitious set-up of the sting.

Caught up in the meltdown Allaine confesses the deceit, and the bottle-loving former actress who played  Madame Pelletier (Margaret Wycherly) implicates herself. With all four blackmailers behind bars Talbot is cleared, his marriage saved, and ambassadorial honors lie dead ahead.

Cast
 William Powell as David Talbot
 Hedy Lamarr as Lucienne Talbot
 Claire Trevor as Michelle Allaine
 Basil Rathbone as Henri Sarrou
 Margaret Wycherly as Madame Pelletier
 Felix Bressart as Dr. Andre Tessier
 Sig Ruman as Dr. Alex Dubroc
 H. B. Warner as the Prosecuting Attorney
 Philip Merivale as the Commissaire
 Vladimir Sokoloff as Carlos Le Duc
 Anna Q. Nilsson as 	Madame Deval
 Bertram Marburgh as 	Pierre 
 John Mylong as Baron De Lorrain
 James Rennie	Monsieur Charles Martin
 Alphonse Martell as Headwaiter 
 Guy Bates Post as 	President of the Court
 Gibson Gowland as 	Reporter
 Louis Natheaux as Reporter 
 Ellinor Vanderveer as 	Cafe Patron

Reception

Box office
According to MGM records, the film cost $846,000 to make, and earned $1,523,000 in the US and Canada and $798,000 elsewhere, for a total of $2,231,000, making the studio a profit of $1,473,000, or 175% of its production costs.

Critical response
When the film was released, the staff at Variety magazine praised it, writing "This is a Grade A whodunit, with a superlative cast. The novel story line, which would do credit to an Alfred Hitchcock thriller, has the added potency of Hedy Lamarr and William Powell ... It’s good, escapist drama, without a hint of the war despite its Parisian locale, circa 1935, and evidences excellent casting and good direction. The script likewise well turned out, though better pace would have put the film in the smash class. Its only fault is a perceptible slowness at times, although the running time is a reasonable 82 minutes, caused by a plenitude of talk."

Adaptation
The film was adapted for a Lux Radio Theatre broadcast on March 29, 1943, starring Jean-Pierre Aumont and Lana Turner.

References

External links
 
 
 
 
 Crossroads information site and DVD review at DVD Beaver (includes images)

Streaming audio
 Crossroads on Lux Radio Theatre: March 29, 1943

1942 films
1942 mystery films
American black-and-white films
American mystery films
American remakes of French films
1940s English-language films
Film noir
Films about amnesia
Films directed by Jack Conway
Films scored by Bronisław Kaper
Films set in 1935
Films set in Paris
Metro-Goldwyn-Mayer films
1940s American films